Geographic location The village Dilawarpur is located in Dilawarpur Mandal of Nirmal District in the State of Telangana in India. It is governed by Dilawarpur Gram Panchayat. It comes under Dilawarpur Community Development Block. The nearest town is Nirmal, which is about 14 kilometers away from Nirmal district.

Population  As per available data from the year 2009, 6814 persons live in 1640 house holds in the village Dilawarpur. There are 3613 female individuals and 3201 male individuals in the village. Females constitute 53.02% and males constitute 46.98% of the total population.
There are 724 scheduled castes persons of which 412 are females and 312 are males. Females constitute 56.91% and males constitute 43.09% of the scheduled castes population. Scheduled castes constitute 10.63% of the total population.
There are 680 scheduled tribes persons of which 368 are females and 312 are males. Females constitute 54.12% and males constitute 45.88% of the scheduled tribes population. Scheduled tribes constitute 9.98% of the total population.
Population density of Dilawarpur is 257.62 persons per square kilometer

Land and Natural resources 
 Total area of Dilawarpur is 2645 Hectares as per the data available for the year 2009.
Total sown/agricultural area is 739 ha. About 100 ha is un-irrigated area. About 748 ha is irrigated area. About 548 ha is irrigated by wells/tube wells. About 200 ha is irrigated by tanks/lakes.
About 280.8 ha is in non-agricultural use. About 635.97 ha is used permanent pastures and grazing lands.
About 24.56 ha is lying as current fallow area. About 210 ha is culturable waste land. About 84.44 ha is lying as fallow land other than current fallows. About 650 ha is covered by barren and un-cultivable land.

Communication with Dilawarpur The village is connected by public bus services. There is no railway station more than 10 kms away from the village.

Postal Address:
Dilawarpur,
Nirmal,
Telangana, India
PIN - 504306

Edited by  : Kustapuram Ramakanth (Army)

References 

Villages in Nirmal district